Srđan Simović (Serbian Cyrillic: Срђан Симовић; born 17 July 1985) is a Serbian footballer who plays for Canadian Soccer League club Serbian White Eagles FC.

Career

Superliga  
Simović played various times in Serbia's top-tier league initially with Mladost Apatin for the 2006-07 season. He continued playing in the country's SuperLiga with Metalac Gornji Milanovac where he had several different stints with the club. In 2012, he furthered his career in the top tier by signing with FK Radnički 1923.

Mongolia 
In January 2020, Simović joined Ulaanbaatar City in Mongolia under newly hired Serbian coach Vojislav Bralušić.

Canada 
In the summer of 2022, he played abroad in the Canadian Soccer League with the Serbian White Eagles. He helped the Serbs secure the regular-season title which included a playoff berth. In the second round of the postseason, he played against FC Continentals where the Serbs were eliminated from the competition.

Honours
Radnik Surdulica
 Serbian First League: 2014–15

References

External links

 
 Srđan Simović stats at Utakmica.rs

1985 births
Living people
Sportspeople from Čačak
Serbian footballers
Serbian expatriate footballers
Association football defenders
Serbian First League players
Serbian SuperLiga players
Canadian Soccer League (1998–present) players
Serbian White Eagles FC players
FK Voždovac players
FK Metalac Gornji Milanovac players
FK Radnički 1923 players
FK Mladost Apatin players
FK Jedinstvo Ub players
FK Radnik Surdulica players
FK Javor Ivanjica players
FK Borac Čačak players
Ulaanbaatar City FC players
Expatriate footballers in Mongolia
Mongolian National Premier League players